Rosaura is a female given name. It is also the name of a number of ships.

People
Rosaura Andreu, an American actress
Rosaura Lopez, a Spanish author
Rosaura Revueltas, a Mexican actress
Rosaura Zapata, a Mexican educator

Ships
MY Rosaura, a luxury yacht
, an armed boarding vessel

Other
Rosaura at 10 O'Clock, an Argentine film